Qasim Barid I (r. 1489–1504) was prime-minister of the Bahmani sultanate and the founder of the Bidar Sultanate, one of the five late medieval Indian kingdoms together known as the Deccan sultanates.

Biography 
Qasim Barid was a Sunni Turk domiciled in Safavid Georgia. He entered the service of the Bahmani sultan Muhammad Shah III and later became the prime-minister of the Bahmani sultanate.

As Vizier 
Qasim Barid I led one of the first revolts against the Bahmani Sultanate. He was able to get himself made vizier (chief of state) but had seriously undermined the stability of the kingdom.  The Bahmani governors of Junnar, Bijapur and Berar refused to acknowledge the authority of Qasim Barid and, declared independence. In June 1490, Malik Ahmad Nizam-ul-Mulk, the governor of Junnar founded the independent Ahmednagar Sultanate followed by the foundation of the independent Bijapur Sultanate by Yusuf Adil Khan and the Berar Sultanate by Fathullah Imad-ul-Mulk in the same year. The founding of the dynasty occurred in 1492.Qasim Barid died in 1504 and was succeeded by his son Amir Barid I, as the prime minister of the Bahmani Sultanate who also became the de facto ruler like his father.

References

1504 deaths
Deccan sultanates
Year of birth unknown
Barid Shahi sultans
15th-century rulers in Asia
16th-century rulers in Asia
Sunni monarchs
Founding monarchs